Jatindramohan Bhattacharya (1908–1999) was an author and researcher of Bengali and Assamese literature. He served as the professor of Bengali at the University of Calcutta for many years.

Early life and family 
Bhattacharya was born in 1908, to a Bengali Hindu family in the village of Singerkach in Bishwanath, Sylhet District, Eastern Bengal and Assam. His father, Yaminikanta Bhattacharya, was a local mirashdar, and his mother, Mokshada Devi, died when he was only one years old.

Education 
After studying in the local village school, Bhattacharya moved to Meghalaya where he was educated at the Shillong Government High School. He passed his matriculation in 1925, and proceeded to study at the Murari Chand College of Sylhet from where he graduated in 1929. He later completed a Master of Arts in Bengali at the University of Calcutta, graduating with a first class in 1931.

Career 
From 1933 to 1941, Bhattacharya was a Ramtanu Lahiri research assistant. He became an assistant lecture of Bengali at the University of Calcutta in 1939, and remained in this post until 1941. He then returned to Sylhet, to work at Murari Chand College. In 1943, Bhattacharya joined the Cotton College in Guwahati, Assam and was promoted to Head of Bengali in 1952. In 1964, he left that position and spent six years as Reader Head at the PG Bengali Department of Gauhati University. After the independence of Bangladesh in 1971, Bhattacharya moved to Calcutta and joined the Jadavpur University as a UGC-nominated retired teacher in the Bengali Department.

Bhattacharya dedicated his life to literary research and amassed a vast collection of rare manuscripts, books and periodicals in Bengali. His collection is now known as the Jatindramohan Collection under the National Education Board of Jadavpur University. The collection has over 10,000 volumes of books, over 1200 journals, letters and documents, and over 8,000 manuscripts in Bengali (including Sylhet Nagri), Assamese, Sanskrit, Hindi, Persian, Arabic and Meitei.

Awards and works 
In 1937, he was awarded the Griffith Memorial Prize by the University of Calcutta for his thesis The History of Bengali Lexicon, from 1743 to 1867 A.D. In 1945, he was awarded the Khujista Akhtar Banu Suhrawardy Gold Award for writing ‘Banglar Baishnab Bhabapanna Musalman Kabi’ (Bengal's Vaishnavite Muslim Poets). The University of Calcutta awarded him with the Sarojini Basu Gold Medal in 1980 for his research and contributions to Bengali literature. In 1985, the Rabindra Bharati University awarded him with a Doctor of Letters degree.

Among his 26 published works (written and/or edited) are ‘Srihatter Bhattasangit’ (Bhatta Ballads of Sylhet); ‘Bangla Puthir Talika Samannay’ (Collection of Bengali Puthis), ‘Gopal Thakurer Padabali’ (Gopal Thakur's Poetry), ‘Bangla Abhidhan Granther Parichay’ (Background of Bengali dictionary books) and many more. In 1978, he published Catalogus Catalogrum of Bengali manuscripts, Volume I which is a catalogue of 40,000 Bengali manuscripts, and later did the same for Assamese.

Death 
Bhattacharya died in Calcutta, West Bengal in 1990.

See also 
Padmanath Bhattacharya, academic from Sylhet who also researched Bhatta ballads

Notes

References 

Academic staff of the University of Calcutta
People from Bishwanath Upazila
20th-century Bengalis
Murari Chand College alumni
University of Calcutta alumni
Cotton University
Academic staff of Jadavpur University
Educators from West Bengal
20th-century Indian educational theorists